Scaphium is a genus of shining fungus beetles in the family Staphylinidae. There are at least two described species in Scaphium.

Species
These two species belong to the genus Scaphium:
 Scaphium castanipes Kirby, 1837 g b
 Scaphium immaculatum (Olivier, 1790) g
Data sources: i = ITIS, c = Catalogue of Life, g = GBIF, b = Bugguide.net

References

Further reading

 
 
 
 
 
 
 
 
 

Staphylinidae